University of Newcastle can refer to:

 Newcastle University, a university in the United Kingdom
 University of Newcastle (Australia), a university in New South Wales, Australia